Live – Nach uns die Sintflut ("Devil may care";  "Après moi, le déluge") is the eighth album by German rock band Die Ärzte. It is their first live album, released on triple vinyl and double CD, just before the band disbanded.

The band risked with this album being 'indexed' (banned) because of a third sequel of Claudia (Debil - "Claudia hat 'nen Schäferhund" [indexed]; Ab 18 - "Claudia II") and the bonus single featuring the indexed "Geschwisterliebe", sung entirely by fans while the band played.

The album featured many songs written especially to be played live, such as "Madonnas Dickdarm", "Claudia", "Ich bin wild" and "Uns geht's prima". "Madonnas Dickdarm" and "Claudia" (as "Claudia III", shortened) were later released on Das Beste von kurz nach früher bis jetze, along with "Blumen" and "Elke".

The first "Sprüche" is on this album. "Sprüche II" is found on Wir wollen nur deine Seele, the only other 2-CD live album by Die Ärzte. "Sprüche III" was released as the B-side to "Die klügsten Männer der Welt". A part of "Sprüche" was sampled on "Claudia (Teil 95)" on Die Bestie in Menschengestalt (Ja, er starb!-Yes, he died!)

Track listing 
CD 1
 "Ouvertüre zum besten Konzert der Welt" [Overture to the best concert in the world] - 1:34
 "Radio brennt" [Radio burns] - 2:26
 "Mädchen" [Girls] - 2:32
 "Frank'n'stein" - 2:04
 "Ohne dich" [Without you] - 2:02
 "Blumen" [Flowers] - 3:01
 "Sweet Sweet Gwendoline" - 2:04
 "Alleine in der Nacht" [Alone in the night] - 2:31
 "Außerirdische" [Aliens] - 2:16
 "Buddy Holly's Brille" [Buddy Holly's glasses] - 3:48
 "Popstar" - 3:07
 "El Cattivo" [Bad (in Italian)] - 2:46
 "Madonnas Dickdarm" [Madonna's colon] - 1:53
 "Dein Vampyr" [Your vampyre] - 2:31
 "Siegerin" [Winner (female)] - 2:10
 "Westerland" - 3:41
 "2000 Mädchen" [2,000 girls] - 2:51
 "Mysteryland" - 3:24
 "Du willst mich küssen" [You want to kiss me] - 2:59
 "Gute Zeit" [Have a nice time] - 2:56
 "Helmut K." - 2:11
 "Wie am ersten Tag" [Like on the first day] - 2:51

CD 2
 "Wer hat an der Uhr gedreht?" (F. Strittmatter, Q. Amper Jr/E. Storeck) - 0:30
 "Medley"
 a) "When Will I Be Famous" (Bros) - 0:39
 b) "Tell It to My Heart" (Seth Swirsky, Ernie Gold) - 0:17
 c) "Whenever You Need Somebody" (Stock, Aitken and Waterman) - 0:09
 d) "I Should Be So Lucky" (Stock, Aitken and Waterman) - 0:07
 e) "My Bed Is Too Big" (Dieter Bohlen) - 0:10
 f) "Born to Love" (Melloni, Turratti, Chieregato, Beecher) - 0:06
 g) "Kiss" (Prince) - 0:15
 h) "Zu spät" [Too late] (Farin Urlaub) - 3:55
 i) "Blueprint" (K. Franck) - 0:23
 "Elke" - 3:53
 "Ist das alles?" [Is that all?] - 3:05
 "Claudia" - 4:58
 "Radio Rap" - 2:31
 "Roter Minirock" [Red miniskirt] - 2:01
 "Scheisstyp" [Shitty guy] - 2:17
 "Sie kratzt" [She scratches] - 2:10
 "Teenager Liebe" [Teenager love] - 2:36
 "Vollmilch" [Whole milk] - 2:15
 "Ich bin wild" [I'm wild] - 3:34
 "Uns geht's prima" [We're doing great] - 1:48
 "Sprüche" [Patter] - 18:50
 "♀" - 10:02

Bonus single
 "Der Ritt auf dem Schmetterling (Instrumental)" [The ride on the butterfly] - 4:05

Song information 
Tracks not listed below were first released on this album.

 Tracks 3, 4, 12 (CD1), "Zu spät", tracks 7, 8 (CD2) from Debil
 Tracks 7, 8, 18, 22 (CD1), 4 (CD2) from Die Ärzte
 Tracks 10, 14, 19 (CD1) from Im Schatten der Ärzte
 Tracks 2, 17 (CD1) from Ist das alles? (13 Höhepunkte mit den Ärzten)
 Track 6 (CD2) from "Radio brennt (Dingleberry-Mix)"
 Tracks 21 (CD1), 9 (CD2) from Ab 18
 Tracks 5, 6, 9, 11, 15, 16, 20 (CD1), 3, 15 (CD2) from Das ist nicht die ganze Wahrheit...
 "Teenager Liebe" and "Vollmilch" were later released on Die Ärzte früher!, but "Teenager Liebe" was before also released on Zu schön, um wahr zu sein! and Uns geht's prima...

Singles
1988: "Der Ritt auf dem Schmetterling (Instrumental)" (bonus single included with earlier versions of the album)
1988: "Live – Zu spät..."

Personnel
Farin Urlaub – guitar, vocals
Bela Felsenheimer – drums, vocals
Hagen Liebing – bass guitar, vocals

Charts

References

External links
http://www.razien.de/sprueche/2419/

Die Ärzte live albums
1988 live albums
German-language live albums